Universiade 2009 may refer to:
 2009 Winter Universiade
 2009 Summer Universiade

See also 
 2009 Universiade (disambiguation)